Acropora aculeus is a species of acroporid corals found throughout the Indian Ocean, the central Indo-Pacific, Australia, southeast Asia, Japan and the East China Sea. It is also present in the western Pacific Ocean. It is an uncommon species and is particularly prone to coral bleaching, disease, and crown-of-thorns starfish predation; it is also harvested for use in aquaria, and the International Union for Conservation of Nature has assessed it as being a "vulnerable species". Habitat loss is a big concern.

Description
Acropora aculeus forms corymbose, pillow-like structures, the horizontal branches being slender and spreading while the upright branches are narrow and shorter. The corallites are distinctive, longer than they are wide, smooth and polished. This coral is usually yellowish or grey, but can be bright bluish-green, and the tips of the branches are often yellow, pale blue, green or brown.  It is usually yellow on the Great Barrier Reef and in the Philippines, but pale brown in western Australia. It is named as  ACR ACUL in Coral Codes.

Distribution and habitat
Acropora aculeus is native to the Indo-Pacific region, its range extending from the east coast of Africa and Madagascar to Taiwan, Japan, Indonesia, Australia and some island groups in the eastern Pacific Ocean. It is endemic to the Philippines  distributed in Samoa, Great Barrier Reef, Sri Lanka, South Vietnam, and the Marshall Islands. It is found on all parts of the reef, particularly the front slope, and also in lagoons. Its form varies with its degree of exposure to wave action, being more massive in exposed locations and more pillow-like in lagoons.

Status
The reefs on which Acropora aculeus lives are under threat from global warming, increased ocean acidification and reef destruction. It is a generally uncommon species of coral and is particularly susceptible to bleaching and coral diseases. The International Union for Conservation of Nature has assessed its conservation status as being "vulnerable", considering that 37% of the colonies may be lost in the next thirty years (three generation lengths).  Others suggest it is endangered, along with 76% of the Acropora corals.

References

Acropora
Cnidarians of the Pacific Ocean
Cnidarians of the Indian Ocean
Marine fauna of Asia
Marine fauna of Oceania
Marine fauna of Southeast Asia
Anthozoa of Australia
Vulnerable fauna of Asia
Vulnerable fauna of Oceania
Corals described in 1846
Taxa named by James Dwight Dana